Totnes Valley is a locality in New South Wales, Australia. It is located 42 kilometres north-east of Mudgee.

References

Localities in New South Wales
Towns in the Central West (New South Wales)